There are at least 18 members of the primrose order, Primulales, found in Montana. Some of these species are exotics (not native to Montana) and some species have been designated as Species of Concern.

Family: Primulaceae

Anagallis arvensis, scarlet pimpernel
Androsace chamaejasme, sweet-flower rock-jasmine
Androsace filiformis, filiform rockjasmine
Androsace occidentalis, western rock-jasmine
Androsace septentrionalis, pygmy-flower rock-jasmine
Centunculus minimus, chaffweed
Dodecatheon conjugens, Bonneville shootingstar
Dodecatheon jeffreyi, Jeffrey's shootingstar
Dodecatheon pulchellum, few-flower shootingstar
Douglasia conservatorum, Bloom Peak douglasia
Douglasia montana, mountain douglasia
Glaux maritima, sea milkwort
Lysimachia ciliata, fringed loosestrife
Lysimachia thyrsiflora, water loosestrife
Primula alcalina, alkali primrose
Primula incana, mealy primrose
Primula parryi, Parry's primrose

Further reading

See also
 List of dicotyledons of Montana

Notes

Montana
Montana